St. Valentine's Day is a 1948 Decca Records compilation album of recordings by Bing Crosby.

Background
Bing Crosby had enjoyed unprecedented success during the 1940s, with his output including six No. 1 hits in 1944 alone. His films, such as Going My Way and The Bells of St. Mary's, were huge successes as were the Road films he made with Bob Hope. On radio, his Kraft Music Hall and Philco Radio Time shows were very popular. Decca Records exploited this by issuing a number of 78rpm album sets, some featuring fresh	material and others using Crosby's back catalogue. Ten of these sets were released in 1946, nine in 1947 and nine more in 1948. Most of these 78rpm albums were reissued as 10" vinyl LP's in subsequent years.

St. Valentine's Day includes two of Crosby's No. 1 hits from 1944 – "I'll Be Seeing You" and "I Love You" –  two other chart entries ("You and I" and "Miss You") plus  re-recordings of the singer's first ever recordings for Decca in 1934 "I Love You Truly" and  "Just A-Wearyin' for You".

Reception
The album reached No. 8 in the Billboard list of best-selling popular albums in February 1949.

Track listing
These songs were featured on a four 10" 78 rpm album set, Decca Album No. A-621.

LP release
The album was also issued as a 10" vinyl LP in 1949 with the catalogue number DL 5039.

See also
 Valentine's Day

References 

Bing Crosby compilation albums
Decca Records compilation albums
1948 compilation albums